Malltraeth (origin: Mall (corrupt, blasted, desolate, + Traeth (beach)))  is a small village in the southwest of Anglesey, in the community of Bodorgan. It is now at the end of a large bay, which used to extend much further inland, almost creating a second sea strait in the area (the Menai Strait broke through following the end of the ice age). The population as of the 2011 census was only 255.

Despite this, the land remains very wet and prone to flooding, much of it of great natural and scientific importance as a result. The former salt marsh creeks are still visible on aerial photography and evident as shallow depressions in the fields. Coal mining occurred for a time in the underlying Carboniferous rock strata and the subsidence of these workings resulted in the lakes "Llynnau Gwaith-glo".

The village takes its name from the expanse of sand which used to exist there, some of which survives downstream of the Cob. Malltraeth means "unwholesome strand" and is recorded from at least 1304. The extent of the previous strand or beach is reflected in the names Trefdraeth ("strand farm") and Glantraeth ("strand edge"), north of Malltraeth and now far from the shore.

The village had two pubs: The Royal Oak and The Joiners Arms. The Royal Oak closed in 2015 and The Joiners Arms remained closed for an extended period after the COVID pandemic lockdown in 2020, however it finally reopened in early 2022. It also had a village Post Office and shop at 16 High Street, but this closed as a victim of Royal Mail making deep cuts in local post offices.  A mainline railway runs just a few hundred metres north of the village, but there is no station. The nearest stations are Bodorgan, a request stop, which offers limited local journeys, along with Bangor and Holyhead, which offer more frequent access to longer distance travel to most parts of Wales, England and Scotland.

On Sunday 26 September 2010, a newly constructed picnic area 'Clwt Glas' overlooking the Cefni Estuary in Malltraeth was opened by Olympic athlete Colin Jackson CBE and 99-year-old Mrs M A Edwards MBE, a long time and distinguished resident of the area.  'Clwt Glas' (Green Patch) was an area of land at the lower end of Malltraeth and was essentially the reverse side of a mound built as part of the scheme to reclaim the Cefni Marsh (Cors Ddyga) during the latter years of the 18th Century.  It was transformed as a community project with the help of several grants into a picnic area, garden and information point.

The long-established Meyrick landowning family of Bodorgan are located within the area, and are the owners of the Anglesey Racing Circuit near Aberffraw. Older still is the ancient standing stone found on the northern edge of the village.

Malltraeth Marsh
The reclaimed land is called Malltraeth Marsh, through which runs the Afon Cefni, which was canalised in 1824. The marsh is a Site of Special Scientific Interest and is particularly renowned for its bird life, beautifully captured in Charles Tunnicliffe's paintings, which form the resident gallery at Oriel Ynys Môn, near Llangefni. There is an RSPB reserve in the marsh area.

References

 The Place Names of Anglesey, 2004. G J Jones & Tomos Roberts.

External links 
photos of Malltraeth and surrounding area on geograph

Villages in Anglesey
Sites of Special Scientific Interest in West Gwynedd
Royal Society for the Protection of Birds reserves in Wales
Populated coastal places in Wales
Bodorgan